Jio Platforms is an Indian multinational technology company, headquartered in Mumbai. It is a subsidiary of Reliance Industries. Established in 2019, it acts as a holding company for India's largest mobile network operator Jio and other digital businesses of Reliance.

Since April 2020, Reliance Industries has raised  by selling 32.97% equity stake in the company. In August 2021, it was ranked 155th on the 2021 Fortune Global 500 list of world's biggest corporations.

History
In October 2019, Reliance Industries Limited (RIL) announced the creation of a wholly owned subsidiary for its digital businesses including Jio. In November 2019, the subsidiary was named Jio Platforms. The  liability of Jio was transferred to RIL and in turn RIL received preferential shares of Jio Platforms. According to some observers, the restructuring was done to keep the digital businesses of the group within a debt-free entity.

According to this deal, while Jio Platforms retained , the parent company got the remaining  for redeeming the optionally convertible preference shares it held in the subsidiary.

In May 2020, private equity firm Silver Lake Partners obtained a 1.15% stake with a  investment in the company. But unlike the previous transaction, the entire investment in this case was retained by Jio Platforms. General Atlantic then announced that it would invest  in Jio Platforms for a 1.34% stake in the company.

Silver Lake increased its stake to 2.08% with an additional  investment. On 13 June, TPG Capital, an investment company, took stake in Jio platform of 0.93% worth .

In June 2021, Jio Platforms unveiled their Android smartphone named JioPhone Next, with plans to launch in India by September 2021.

In February 2022, Jio Platforms formed a joint venture with satellite operator SES. The newly formed Jio Space Technology Limited will deliver broadband services in India of up to 100Gbit/s capacity using SES's SES-12 high-throughput geostationary satellite and the forthcoming O3b mPOWER medium Earth orbit satellite constellation, to extend JPL's terrestrial network, enhancing access to digital services in unconnected areas within India and the region. JPL and SES will own 51% and 49% equity stake respectively in the new company.

Ownership

Businesses

Consumer platforms 
Jio, telecommunications and broadband services
Jio Apps
MyJio
JioTV, live TV streaming app
JioCinema, video-on-demand app
JioSaavn, an online music streaming service
JioChat, messaging app
JioMeet, video-conferencing platform
JioStore, app store for Jio STB
JioGamesCloud, Jio's cloud gaming service
JioPages, web browser
JioPay, digital payments and financial services app
JioSwitch, file sharing app
JioNews, newspaper and magazine app
JioHome, mobile remote control for Jio set-top box
JioGate, apartment security app
JioCloud, cloud storage services
JioSecurity, security app
JioHealthHub, health companion
JioPOS Lite, Jio recharge commission earning app
JioGameslite, online gaming
JioMoney, digital currency and payments services
JioMart, online grocery delivery services (partnership with Reliance Retail)
 JioSign , online digital signing platform

Enterprise platforms 

 JioAttendance
 JioMeet for Business
 JioOnline - Online marketing tool
 JioGST

Acquisitions and investments
 
RIL has acquired or invested in several companies, which are now under Jio Platforms:

Valuation
In 2020, the enterprise value of Jio Platforms was estimated to be . The company was also reported to be more valuable than all other businesses of RIL put together. Its market capitalization put it fourth on the list of largest Indian companies, behind RIL (combined entity), Tata Consultancy Services and HDFC Bank.

See also
 List of telecom companies in India
 List of companies of India

References

 56.^https://www.business-standard.com/article/companies/mukesh-ambani-buys-38-5-in-extramarks-education-111110800130_1.html

External links
 

Reliance Industries subsidiaries
Indian companies established in 2019
Jio
2019 establishments in Maharashtra
Companies based in Mumbai
Public Investment Fund